The 11th Parliament of Kiribati was the legislature of Kiribati following the 2015–16 parliamentary election of members of parliament (MPs) to the House of Assembly (Maneaba ni Maungatabu).

Members

Former members

References

Politics of Kiribati
Political organisations based in Kiribati
Government of Kiribati